James Williamson (born 27 March 1989) is a New Zealand professional road cyclist who currently rides for New Zealand Cycling Project.

Major results 
Source;

2005
 2nd Time trial, National Novice Road Championships
2006
 2nd Road race, National Junior Road Championships
2008
 3rd Le Race
2009
 1st  Road race, National Under-23 Road Championships
2010
 1st Stage 3 Tour of the Murray River
 2nd Road race, National Under-23 Road Championships
2011
 2nd Road race, National Under-23 Road Championships
 3rd Overall Tour of Wellington
1st Stage 1
 6th Philadelphia International Cycling Classic
2012
 2nd Road race, National Road Championships
 10th Overall Tour de Filipinas
2014
 5th Road race, National Road Championships
2020
 8th Gravel and Tar

References 

1989 births
Living people
New Zealand male cyclists
Cyclists from Auckland
21st-century New Zealand people